The Bureau of Transportation Statistics (BTS), part of the United States Department of Transportation, is a government office that compiles, analyzes, and publishes information on the nation's transportation systems across various modes; and strives to improve the DOT's statistical programs through research and the development of guidelines for data collection and analysis. BTS is a principal agency of the U.S. Federal Statistical System.

History
BTS was created in 1992 under the Intermodal Surface Transportation Efficiency Act. 

On February 20, 2005, BTS became part of the Research and Innovative Technology Administration (RITA). Through the Fixing America's Surface Transportation (FAST) Act passed on December 4, 2015, BTS and RITA moved to the Office of the Assistant Secretary of Transportation for Research and Technology.

Since 2009, BTS has also maintained a Twitter feed, with regular tweets related to the release of BTS data products and news bulletins concerning transportation trends in the United States. Since 2020, BTS has also maintained a LinkedIn account.

Offices
BTS is divided into seven offices:
 Office of Statistical and Economic Analysis
 Office of Data Development and Standards
 Office of Transportation Analysis
 Office of Spatial Analysis and Visualization
 Office of Airline Information
 Office of Information and Library Sciences
 Office of Safety Data and Analysis

Services

Airline Information
BTS' Office of Airline Information is responsible for publishing regular reports—often monthly or quarterly—on airline performance in the United States. Topics include airline financials, origins and destinations, passenger traffic, on-time performance, and mishandled baggage.

Data Catalogs 
TranStats is an intermodal transportation collection of downloadable databases.  One popular database included in the TranStats collection is the airline on-time performance database, which includes on-time performance of every flight, airline, and airport in the United States. Data.bts.gov is an online dataset collection allowing users to create their own visualizations from selected BTS data.

National Transportation Atlas Database 
BTS maintains the National Transportation Atlas Database (NTAD), an open online repository of national-level geographic information systems data and applications related to transportation in the United States.

National Transportation Library

Another BTS product is the National Transportation Library (NTL), an online repository of transportation-centric research, reports, and datasets. Documents, which include products internal and external to the US Department of Transportation, can be accessed through a platform called RosaP.

Other products

COVID-19 and Transportation
Border Crossing Data
Commodity Flow Survey
Freight Analysis Framework
National Census of Ferry Operators
Pocket Guide App
Port Performance Freight Statistics Program
TransBorder Freight Data
Transportation Economic Trends
Transportation Statistics Annual Reports

National Transportation Statistics
State Transportation Statistics
County Transportation Profiles
Monthly Transportation Statistics
The Week In Transportation

State and country codes 
The BTS maintains its own list of codes, so-called World Area Codes (WAC), for state and country codes.

References

External links

Official site
National Transportation Library
data.bts.gov
transtats.bts.gov

United States Department of Transportation agencies
National statistical services
Federal Statistical System of the United States
Statistical organizations in the United States